West Wickham is an area of South East London, England, mainly within the London Borough of Bromley with some parts lying in the London Borough of Croydon. Before the creation of Greater London in 1965, West Wickham was in Kent.

History

The history of West Wickham predates the Norman Conquest of England in 1066. West Wickham is mentioned in the Domesday Book of 1086 with the following entry: "In lordship 2 ploughs. 24 villagers have 4 ploughs. 13 slaves; a church; a mill at 20d.; a wood at 10 pigs. Value before 1066 8; later 6: now 13. Godric son of Karl held it from King Edward". The name dates to Anglo-Saxon and is possibly a corruption of the Latin vicus, denoting an earlier Roman settlement. The 'West' was added in the 13th century to differentiate it from East Wickham, situated some distance away to the north-east.

In Tudor times, the Manor House, Wickham Court, was expanded by the Boleyn family and the area was popular for deer hunting. The Grade I listed building was built by Sir Henry Heydon in 1469. His wife was Anne Boleyn (Bullen), a daughter of Sir Geoffrey Boleyn, who was Lord Mayor of London in 1469. She was the great-aunt of Queen Anne Boleyn, second wife of Henry VIII. The house was later sold to the Lennard family in 1580. In 1935, it was sold and adapted for use as an hotel. After World War II, it was sold to the Daughters of Mary and Joseph, an American order of nuns and occupied by Coloma College (a teacher training college) run by the Daughters of Mary and Joseph. From 1978 to 1996 it was occupied by Schiller International University and is now home to Wickham Court Preparatory School.

Until the 1900s West Wickham remained a small village. The inter-war period saw rapid development and the transformation of the area into a suburb of London, facilitated by the arrival of the railway station, which opened in 1882. Much of the formerly extensive West Wickham Common was built over, though a small tract was purchased and preserved by the Corporation of London in 1892. At the crossroads by the Swan pub formerly stood the Stocks Tree, a large elm tree so named as it lay behind the village stocks. It was damaged during the laying down of sewerage pipes in the 1930s and was moved to Blake Recreation Ground in 1935, but later blew down in a storm. The tree is commemorated in the village sign and a plaque, both of which stand outside the library, with a piece of the tree on display inside.

Modern-day West Wickham is a suburb of Greater London, after the London Government Act 1963, which came into effect in 1965, with West Wickham absorbed into the London Borough of Bromley. The area is a fairly typical outer London suburb, consisting of predominantly 1930s housing, with a row of shops, restaurants and a library along the High Street and another set around the train station area. There are four pubs in the area - The Swan and the Wheatsheaf on the High Street, The Railway by the station and The Real Ale Way micropub, opened in 2021 in Station Road. There are also several parks, such as West Wickham playing fields (McAndrews), Wickham Park and Blakes Recreation ground.

Education
West Wickham (including Coney Hall as it is a district of West Wickham) has four state schools (all primary schools). They are Oak Lodge, Wickham Common, Pickhurst and Hawes Down. St David's Prep and Wickham Court (serving as a nursery, primary school and secondary school) are private schools. In 2012, Wickham Common won a hockey gold medal when they represented Bromley in the London Youth Games.

There are no secondary schools in West Wickham, but there are some in neighbouring areas. Langley Park School for Boys and Langley Park School for Girls are located in Beckenham, Hayes School is located in Hayes, and Ravens Wood School is located in Keston.

All Saints' Catholic School was a secondary school located on Layhams Road, West Wickham, London Borough of Bromley which closed in 2007 a few years after a major fraud scandal.

Transport

Rail
West Wickham railway station serves the area with services to London Charing Cross, London Cannon Street via Lewisham and Hayes.

Buses
West Wickham is served by several Transport for London buses connecting it with areas including Beckenham, Bromley, Croydon, Hayes, Penge, Sydenham and Thornton Heath.

Sport and leisure

West Wickham has a non-League football club Glebe F.C. who play at Oakley Road.

West Wickham is home to Beccehamians RFC a rugby union club founded in 1933 which plays competitive rugby at Sparrows Den at the bottom of Corkscrew Hill.

Other clubs nearby include Croydon RFC (formerly Shirley Wanderers), a club that currently competes in Surrey 1, that has a rugby pitch used often for county matches.

Arts and popular culture 

Since 1958 the area has had an Arts association and since 1967 it has had its own community theatre known as Theatre 62 / West Wickham Theatre centre.

On 1 August 1964, Blakes Recreation Ground hosted a concert featuring Manfred Mann (featuring Paul Jones), The Merseybeats and the Johnny Dankworth Orchestra.

The town appeared in the 2000 UK television series The 1940s House, with 17 Braemar Gardens taking the starring role as a family lived a World War II experience in a typical London suburb.

Notable people
William Burnside, mathematician, buried in West Wickham parish church.
Michael Carberry, cricketer, attended St John Rigby College.
Thomas Carew (1595 at West Wickham – 1640) an English poet, among the 'Cavalier' group.
Violet Cressy-Marcks, explorer, born and grew up in West Wickham.
Stephen Dillane, actor, grew up in West Wickham.
Gordon Fergus-Thompson, pianist.
Simon Haynes, author, grew up in West Wickham.
Charlie Heather, drummer in The Levellers.
Elton John , music artist and national treasure owns a home, just behind the Lidl, where he often weekends with family and friends.
Judy Oakes, athlete.
Chris Philp, Conservative politician, grew up in West Wickham.
 Alan Ridout - composer, born in West Wickham.
Henry Hake Seward, architect, buried at St John the Baptist church.
Skream, DJ & producer, grew up in West Wickham.

Gallery

References

External links

 For information on the history of West Wickham
 Historical images of West Wickham

Areas of London
Districts of the London Borough of Bromley
Former civil parishes in the London Borough of Bromley
District centres of London